Konstantin Dmitryevich Golubev (27 March 1896 – 9 June 1956) was a Soviet general and army commander. 

He was born in Petrovsk, Saratov Governorate (in present-day Saratov Oblast). He fought in World War I in the Imperial Russian Army before going over to the Bolsheviks. He was a recipient of the Order of Lenin, the Order of the Red Banner, the Order of Kutuzov, the Medal "For the Defence of Moscow", the Medal "For the Victory over Germany in the Great Patriotic War 1941–1945", the Medal "For the Victory over Japan", the Jubilee Medal "XX Years of the Workers' and Peasants' Red Army", the Jubilee Medal "30 Years of the Soviet Army and Navy" and the Medal "In Commemoration of the 800th Anniversary of Moscow". He also received the Virtuti Militari and the Order of the Cross of Grunwald from Poland. He died in Moscow.

Sources
 Коллектив авторов. «Великая Отечественная. Командармы. Военный биографический словарь» — М.; Жуковский: Кучково поле, 2005.

External links
 Константин Дмитриевич Голубев с бойцами 34-й отдельной роты охраны военного совета 43-й армии.

1896 births
1956 deaths
Recipients of the Order of Lenin
Recipients of the Order of the Red Banner
Recipients of the Order of Kutuzov, 1st class
Russian military personnel of World War I
Soviet military personnel of the Russian Civil War
Soviet military personnel of World War II
Recipients of the Virtuti Militari
Recipients of the Order of the Cross of Grunwald
Frunze Military Academy alumni
Military Academy of the General Staff of the Armed Forces of the Soviet Union alumni